The East Kainji languages are spoken in a compact area of the Jos Plateau in Nigeria, near Jos. There are more than 20 of them, most of which are poorly studied.

History
East Kainji languages are less internally diverse than some of the other Plateau branches in the Nigerian Middle Belt (Blench 2007). Historically, the East Kainji branch had been influenced by Chadic languages that no longer exist in the region. Today, there are at most 100,000 speakers of East Kainji languages, with almost all languages of the languages being threatened by larger languages such as Hausa and English. Although they are morphologically simple, they have 4-level tones instead of the 3-level tones typical of the region.

At the time of the British conquest, several of these languages were in the process of shifting from duodecimal to decimal systems. Languages attested with such systems include Janji, Gure-Kahugu (Gbiri-Niragu) and Piti.

Features
Compared to the neighbouring Plateau languages, East Kainji languages are morphologically simple. They have four level tones, as opposed to most other languages in the Nigerian Middle Belt having only three level tones. The fourth tone in East Kainji languages originated as a superhigh tone used to mark plurals.

Syllables in East Kainji languages are generally open (CV). Blench (2020) suggests that the East Kainji branch is most closely related to Basa, since both have (C)V-CVCV phonotactic structures.

Classification
East Kainji was once thought to be a primary branch of the Kainji languages, but this is no longer the case. Impressionistically, Piti and Atsam appear to be distinct, but the rest form a continuous dialect chain.

The East Kainji languages have historically undergone influence from non-Hausa West Chadic languages. East Kainji is not as internally diverse as West Kainji.

Ethnologue
Ethnologue indicates several branches; these will be retained here for reference:

 Piti–Atsam
 Jos languages: Amo (Map)
 Northern Jos languages:
 Jera languages: Lere, Ziriya (Sheni?)
 Lameic languages: Gyem, Shau
 Ningic  languages: Gamo-Ningi, Kudu-Camo
 North-Central Jos  languages: Iguta, Janji, Tunzuii (Tunzu)
 Boze-Loro languages: Jere, Panawa
 Chokobo-Lemoro-Sanga languages: Izora
 Lemoro-Sanga languages: Lemoro, Sanga
 Kauru languages: Kurama, Gbiri-Niragu (Gure-Kahugu), Bina, Dungu, Kaivi, Kinuku, Kono, Mala, Ruma, Shuwa-Zamani, Surubu, Tumi, Vono

Blench (2018)
Most recent Kainji classification by Blench (2018:83):

 Amic languages: Map
 Tsamic languages: Tsam (Cahwai), Ngmgbang, Bishi (Piti)
 Kaduna languages: Gbiri-Niragu, Shuwa-Zamani, Vori (Shuwa-Zamani), Kurmi (Kurama), Mala-Ruma, Bin, Kono, Kaivi, Vono, Tumi, Dungu, Nu (Kinuku)
 North-central cluster: Lemoro, Janji, Iguta, Zora (Cokobo) (moribund)
 Shammɔ cluster: Sanga, Gusu, Moro, Loro, Bunu, Tunzu (Duguza)
 (branch): Zele (Jere), Boze, Panawa
 Northern Jos group:
 Sheni cluster: Ziriya (extinct), Kere (extinct), Sheni (almost extinct)
 Lere cluster: Si (extinct), Gana (extinct), Takaya (extinct)
 Lame cluster: Gyem, Shau (extinct)
 Ningi cluster: Kudu-Camo (almost extinct), Gamo-Ningi (Butu-Ningi) (extinct)

Blench (2012)
In Blench's 2012 classification, Piti–Atsam is named "Southern". Northern Jos is named "Jos", and the Jera languages are named "Northern Jos", which he further subdivides into several dialect clusters; Amo is placed in this group.

In the tree below given by Blench (2012), East Kainji is split into a core Jos group and peripheral Southern group.

 Southern group: Piti, Atsam
 Jos group (Jera):
 Lere cluster: Si (almost extinct), Gana (almost extinct), Takaya (almost extinct)
 North-central cluster:, Izora (Cokobo), Lemoro, Sanga, Janji, εBoze (Buji), iGusu, iZele (Jere), iBunu (Ribina), iPanawa-iLoro, Iguta, Tunzu (Duguza), tiMap
 Sheni cluster: Ziriya (extinct), Kere (extinct), Sheni (almost extinct)
 Kauru group: Gbiri-Niragu, Shuwa-Zamani, Surubu, Kurama, Mala-Ruma, Bina, Kono, Kaivi, Vono, Tumi, Kinuku, Dungu
 Northern group (Ningi-Lame):
 Ningi cluster: Kudu-Camo (almost extinct), Gamo-Ningi (Butu-Ningi) (†)
 Lame cluster: Gyem (almost extinct), Shau (almost extinct)

Shimizu (1982)
Classification of the Northern Jos group according to Shimizu (1982: 165):
Northern Jos
R-group
Rahama: Ziriya, Sheni
South:  Janji, Jere, Guta
L-group
Central
Zora (Chokobo)
Moro, Sanga
North
Lere
Takaya (Taura)
Si (Rishuwa), Gana
Lame-Ningi
Lame: Gyem, Shau
Ningi
Kudu (Kuda), Chamo
Gamo (Butu),  Ningi

Shimizu (1982) also reconstructs Proto-Northern Jos.

Glottolog
Glottolog's classification is similar to Blench's, but the Piti–Atsam name is retained. In this classification, all languages except for Piti–Atsam are grouped under "Jos". Amo, while within the "Jos" group, is left out of both Kauru and Jera (or "Northern Jos", following Blench).

Only Kurama, Gbiri-Niragu, Jere, Sanga and Lemoro have more than a few thousand speakers.

Names and locations
Below is a comprehensive list of East Kainji language names, populations, and locations from Blench (2019).

Lexical comparison
The following table shows the singular and plural forms for ‘arm, hand’ from various East Kainji language varieties. Names in parentheses are from Williamson (1972). The data has been combined by Blench (2020) from Williamson (1972), Shimizu (1979, 1982), and Blench's unpublished field data.

See also
List of Proto-Northern Jos reconstructions (Wiktionary)

References

External links
ComparaLex, database with East Kainji word lists

 
Kainji languages